Akram Fahimian (born 17 December 1990) is an Iranian poet who has gained success inside of Iran. She began writing poetry when she was sixteen, frequently winning awards at poetry festivals. She is also a photographer. She created a wiki for artists, Artists Database, in 2013 at the age of 23.

Awards
Chosen in festival poetry students - 2007
Candidate from Poetry Festival "expected" - 2010
Chosen in festival for the poem "Prayer" - 2010
Candidate in festival for the poem "Defence" - 2011
Chosen in festival for the poem "Bharnarnj" - 2012
Chosen in festival for the poem "Bharnarnj" - 2013
Chosen in festival for the poem "Palm and Olive Graft" - 2014

References

External links
Video Clips Of Akram Fahimian photos
Akram Fahimian Photos
Page Akram Fahimian Poetry (Persian)

20th-century Iranian poets
1990 births
Living people
21st-century Iranian poets